SC Staaken is a German sports club in Staaken, Berlin Germany. The club was founded in 1919.

History 

The club was founded on 12 July 1919. During this time, Hans Berndt played for the club as a youth player. In 1937, the club merged with MTV 1906 Staaken and formed TSV Staaken 1906. The club then merged again in 1942 with BSG Klüssendorf and formed KSG Staaken/Klüssendorf until the end of World War II.

After the war ended in 1945, Lufthansa SG Berlin dissolved and joined the team to create SG Staaken. The team was able to win Group C of the 1945–46 Oberliga Berlin, but finished in 3rd place behind SG Wilmersdorf and SG Prenzlauer Berg-West in the championship stage. They stayed in the league for another season but were relegated to the 1. Amateurliga.

The club split in 1948 and parts of the club became MTV 06 Staaken. SC Staaken then spent many years in the Regionalliga Berlin and the amateur leagues. The club made it to the 4th round of the 1981/1982 Berliner Landespokal but were defeated by FC Wacker Lankwitz, 5–0. The club earned promotion to what is now called the Berlin-Liga in 1986 and were eventually relegated to the 7th tier Landesliga Berlin. In 2017, they earned promotion into the 5th tier league, NOFV-Oberliga. As of January 2023, the club currently competes in the NOFV-Oberliga Nord.

Notable players and staff 

 Hans Berndt - He played for SC Staaken as a youth player from 1924 to 1936. He then went on to play for VfB Königsberg, Tennis Borussia Berlin and the German national team.

 Marvin Knoll - He played for the club as a youth player. He made appearances for Hertha BSC and the German youth national teams.

 Maximilian Mittelstädt - He played for the club as a youth player. He then player over 130 games for Hertha BSC and played the German U-19, U-20 and U-21 national teams.

 Manuel Schmiedebach - He played for the club as a youth player. He made appearances for Hertha BSC and the German youth national teams.

 Julian Eitschberger - He played for the club as a youth player and later played for Hertha BSC and the  German national youth football team.

 Tim Maciejewski - He played for the club as a youth player and later played in the Bundesliga for 1. FC Union Berlin.

 Oliver Holzbecher - He played for the club as a youth player and later played for Hertha BSC and the  West Germany national youth football team.

 Ralf Lehmann - He played for the club as a youth player and later played for the  German national youth football team.

In popular culture 

SC Staaken has been featured in the video game series, Football Manager since 2015.

References

External links 
Official Website

Football clubs in Berlin
Berlin
Association football clubs established in 1919
1919 establishments in Germany
Football clubs in Germany